Encyclopaedia Beliana is a Slovak encyclopedia. When completed, it will contain ca. 150,000 headwords in twelve illustrated volumes, as well as supplements. Beliana is prepared by the Slovak Academy of Sciences. Its name, Beliana, is derived from Matej Bel, 18th century Slovak writer and historian. As of 2014, seven volumes were published.

Coverage 
Encyclopaedia Beliana is a universal encyclopedia with its contents divided into three parts: the first on natural sciences, the second on spiritual culture and the third on technology.

Volumes

References

External links 
 Official site of the Encyclopaedia Beliana

Slovak encyclopedias
20th-century encyclopedias
21st-century encyclopedias